Butot is a commune in the Seine-Maritime department in the Normandy region in northern France.

Geography

Population

Places of interest
 The church of St.Wulfran, dating from the seventeenth century.
 The chateau de Medine.
 A sixteenth-century stone cross.

See also
Communes of the Seine-Maritime department

References

External links

Website about the commune 
Butot on the Quid website 

Communes of Seine-Maritime